The Bukhara–Tashkent–Bishkek–Almaty pipeline is Uzbekistan's main natural gas export pipeline.

History
Construction of the pipeline started in 1967. In 1968, the pipeline reached to Tashkent, in 1970 to Bishkek (then Frunze) and in 1971 to Almaty.

Description
The Bukhara–Tashkent–Bishkek–Almaty pipeline is the main source of gas supply for Kyrgyzstan and southern part of Kazakhstan. It is possible that the pipeline will be connected with the planned Central Asia-China gas pipeline.

Operators
The Kazakhstan section of pipeline is operated by KazTransGas, a wholly owned subsidiary of KazMunayGas. The Kyrgyzstan section of pipe line is operated by KyrKazGas, the joint venture of KazTransGas and Kyrgyzgas.

Future developments
The technical condition of the pipeline is alarming, particularly in Kyrgyzstan.  Therefore, there are plans for construction of a second trunk gas pipeline and renovation of the existing pipeline.

References

Further reading
Chow, Edward, "Central Asia’s Pipelines: Field of Dreams and Reality," in Pipeline Politics in Asia: The Intersection of Demand, Energy Markets, and Supply Routes (National Bureau of Asian Research, 2010)

Energy infrastructure completed in 1971
Natural gas pipelines in Uzbekistan
Natural gas pipelines in Kyrgyzstan
Natural gas pipelines in Kazakhstan
Natural gas pipelines in the Soviet Union
Energy in Central Asia
Kazakhstan–Kyrgyzstan relations
Kazakhstan–Uzbekistan relations
Kyrgyzstan–Uzbekistan relations